The  is a rapid transit system serving Nagoya, the capital of Aichi Prefecture in Japan. It consists of six lines that cover  of route and serve 87 stations. Approximately 90% of the subway's total track length is underground.

The subway system is owned and operated by Transportation Bureau City of Nagoya and, like other large Japanese cities including Tokyo and Osaka, is heavily complemented by suburban rail, together forming an extensive network of 47 lines in and around Greater Nagoya. Of them, the subway lines represent 38% of Greater Nagoya's total rail ridership of 3 million passengers a day.

In 2002, the system introduced Hatchii as its official mascot.


Lines and infrastructure
The six lines that comprise the Nagoya subway network are, for the most part, independent. However, Meikō Line services partially interline with the Meijō Line, and the operations of both lines are combined. Therefore, there are in fact five distinct services on the subway. They are mostly self-contained, but two of its lines have through services onto lines owned and operated by Meitetsu, the largest private railway operator in the region. One of these, the Kamiida Line, is essentially an extension of the Meitetsu Komaki Line to which it connects.

The first two subway lines, the Higashiyama and Meijō/Meikō Lines, run on standard gauge track and use 600 volt DC electrification from a third rail. They are three of the eleven subway lines in Japan which use both third-rail electrification and standard gauge track (the Ginza and Marunouchi lines in Tokyo are the only other two lines to use third rail at that voltage; five of the eight lines of the Osaka Metro and the Blue Line in Yokohama all use 750 V DC third rail). Subsequent lines were built to narrow gauge and employ 1,500 volt DC electrification from overhead lines, in common with most other rapid transit lines in the country.

As with other railway lines in Japan, tickets can be purchased from ticket vending machines in stations. Since February 2011, this has largely been supplemented by Manaca, a rechargeable smart card. By the next year, it had replaced Tranpass, the predecessor integrated ticketing system, which could be used at all subway stations and for other connected transportation systems in the region.

Notes

Connecting services

JR Central
Tōkaidō Shinkansen: at Nagoya
(for Shin-Yokohama, Tokyo, Kyoto, and Shin-Osaka)
Tōkaidō Main Line: at Nagoya and Kanayama
(for Gifu, Ōgaki, Obu, Kariya, Okazaki, Toyohashi, and Hamamatsu)
Chūō Main Line: at Nagoya, Kanayama, Tsurumai, Chikusa, and Ōzone
(for Kozoji (transfer to former Expo Site), Tajimi, and Nakatsugawa)
Kansai Main Line: at Nagoya and Hatta
(for Yokkaichi, Tsu and Kameyama)
Takayama Main Line: at Nagoya
(Limited Express only, for Gero and Takayama)

Meitetsu
Meitetsu Nagoya Line: at Nagoya and Kanayama
(for Meitetsu Gifu, Chiryu, Hekinan, Nishio, Higashi Okazaki, Toyohashi, and Toyokawa Inari)
Meitetsu Tokoname Line: at Nagoya and Kanayama
(for Otagawa, Chita Handa, Kowa, Utsumi, Tokoname, and Central Japan Int'l Airport)
Meitetsu Inuyama Line: at Nagoya, Kanayama, and Kami-Otai
(for Iwakura, Inuyama, Mikakino and Shin Kani)
Meitetsu Tsushima Line: at Nagoya and Kanayama
(for Tsushima, Saya and Yatomi)
Meitetsu Seto Line: at Sakae and Ōzone
(for Owari Seto)
Meitetsu Toyota Line: at Akaike
(for Toyotashi)

Kintetsu
Kintetsu Nagoya Line: at Nagoya and Hatta
(for Yokkaichi, Tsu, Nakagawa, Matsusaka, Ise, Toba, and Osaka)

Nagoya Seaside Rapid Railway
Aonami Line: at Nagoya
(for Kinjo-Futo (Nagoya International Exhibition Hall))

Network Map

See also
 List of metro systems

References

External links

Transportation Bureau, City of Nagoya – official website
Nagoya Subway at UrbanRail.net